Burgas Municipality (Bulgarian: Община Бургас, Obshtina Burgas) is the most populated municipality in Burgas Province. It includes Burgas, the town of Balgarovo and 12 villages.
After a referendum in 2011 Izvor became part of Burgas Municipality.

Demographics

Religion 
According to the latest Bulgarian census of 2011, the religious composition, among those who answered the optional question on religious identification, was the following:

References

External links

 

Municipalities in Burgas Province